Maria Bertha Charlotte (Mieke) Vogels (born 20 April 1954) Belgian politician from Flanders in the environmentalist party Groen!.

Education 
In 1978, Vogels earned a master's degree in Political and Social Sciences from the University Institution Antwerp (present University of Antwerp).

Political career
 1985 - 1995 : Member of the Belgian Chamber of Representatives
 1995 - 1999 : Member of the city council of Antwerp
 1995 - 1999 : schepen (alderman) of Antwerp
 1999        : Senator of the Belgian Federal Parliament
 1999 - 2002 : Flemish minister of well-being, health and equal opportunities
 2002 - 2003 : Flemish minister of well-being, health, equal opportunities and development cooperation
 2004 - 2006 : OCMW-council member (social services) in Antwerp
 2004 -      : Member of the Flemish Parliament
 2007 -      : Member of the district council in Deurne
 2007 - October 2009 : Chairwoman of the party Groen!

She quit as minister after her party Agalev was heavily defeated in the federal parliament elections of May 2003. She was succeeded by her fellow party member Adelheid Byttebier.

In October 2006 she was elected for the city council of Antwerp, as well as for the district council of Deurne. From 2007 on, she could only accept one of those mandates, and therefore she chose to continue in the district council.

In November 2007, she was elected as chairwoman of the party Groen!, where she succeeded Vera Dua.

After the elections for the Flemish Parliament in June 2009, her party had to deal with another disappointing outcome. Mieke Vogels decided to give up her position as chairwoman so that a younger generation could take over the lead. She was succeeded by Wouter Van Besien in October 2009. Vogels continues her work as member of the Flemish Parliament till the next elections in Belgium.

Family
Vogels is a niece of Gaston and Louis Crauwels, two missionaries in the Belgian Congo who were killed during the Kongolo Massacre on New Year's Day in 1962.

Works

References

Groen (political party) politicians
1954 births
Flemish politicians
Living people
University of Antwerp alumni
21st-century Belgian politicians
21st-century Belgian women politicians